The tomb of Bingia 'e Monti is a pre-nuragic archaeological site located in the municipality of Gonnostramatza, in the province of Oristano, Sardinia.

The tomb has the particularity of being halfway between hypogeism and megalithism. It consists of a compartment carved into the rock and another room whose sides are four large stone blocks and other small stones and whose coverage is with lintels.

It was used between the Chalcolithic and Early Bronze Age by the people of the Monte Claro culture, the Bell Beaker culture and the Bonnanaro culture. Excavations have returned, as well as numerous skeletal remains, several objects including a gold necklace, the oldest artifact of this material ever found in Sardinia.

External links
GONNOSTRAMATZA - DOMUS DE JANAS DI BINGIA E MONTI
Archaeological sites in Sardinia